Filinga Filiga (born 5 January 1985) is a New Zealand former professional rugby league footballer who played for the Bulldogs in the National Rugby League.

Filiga came to Canterbury via Auckland Marist and played in the final two rounds of the 2005 NRL season. Filiga often played as a centre in the Premier League for Canterbury, but was used on the wing in his first-grade appearances.

After leaving Canterbury, Filiga had stints with North Sydney and Cronulla's NSW Cup sides.

Filiga won a Queensland Cup premiership with Sunshine Coast in 2009.

References

External links
Filinga Filiga at Rugby League project

1985 births
Living people
New Zealand rugby league players
Canterbury-Bankstown Bulldogs players
Sunshine Coast Falcons players
Rugby league players from Auckland
Rugby league centres
Rugby league wingers